Between the years 1969 and 1975, many acts performed at the Dagenham Roundhouse venue, which was also known as the Village Blues Club.

Much of the information above otherwise unreferenced is collated from published pictures of posters, tickets etc.

In addition to the above, the bands below played but no dates can be confirmed:

Elder Kindred

Walrus (c.1971)

The bands below are rumoured to have played, but no evidence can be found:

Don Cherry

Leo Sayer (possibly 6 July 1974)

10CC

References

External links
 Village Blues Club at Dagenham Roundhouse Nostalgia Group 

Dagenham